Monster is the debut studio album by American rapper Killer Mike. It was released on March 11, 2003 via Columbia Records. Recording sessions took place at Stankonia Recording, Flamingo Studios, Tree Sound Studios, Level Heads Studio and Doppler Studios in Atlanta, and at Hood Noize Studios. The album peaked at number 10 on the Billboard 200 and at number 4 on the Top R&B/Hip-Hop Albums in the United States.

Track listing 

Notes
Tracks 16 to 29 are all blank tracks, each four seconds in duration.

Chart positions

Weekly charts

Year-end charts

References

External links

2003 debut albums
Albums produced by André 3000
Albums produced by Cool & Dre
Killer Mike albums